Protein transport protein Sec61 subunit alpha isoform 1 is a protein that in humans is encoded by the SEC61A1 gene.

The protein encoded by this gene belongs to the SecY/Sec61α family. It plays a crucial role in the insertion of secretory and membrane polypeptides into the endoplasmic reticulum. This protein found to be tightly associated with membrane-bound ribosomes, either directly or through adaptor proteins. This gene encodes an alpha subunit of the heteromeric SEC61 complex, which also contains beta and gamma subunits.

References

Further reading